Jaílton Alves Miranda (born 2 August 1989), known as Kuca, is a Cape Verdean professional footballer who plays as a forward for Portuguese club U.D. Leiria.

Club career
Born in Praia, Kuca played for AD Bairro and Boavista FC in his country. He moved to Portugal in 2010, signing for lowly SC Mirandela and scoring four goals in 27 games in his first season to help the club promote to the third division.

Early into the 2012 January transfer window, Kuca joined G.D. Chaves. He achieved promotion to the Segunda Liga at the end of 2012–13, making his debut as a professional on 11 August 2013 and scoring the only goal of the away match against C.D. Santa Clara. He added a further 11 until the end of the campaign, as his team comfortably avoided relegation with an eighth-place finish; alongside compatriot Rambé, he was chosen by readers of daily newspaper O Jogo for the team of players competing in that level for the past 12 months.

Kuca moved to Primeira Liga side G.D. Estoril Praia on 26 June 2014. His maiden appearance in the competition took place on 18 August, and he netted in a 1–1 draw at F.C. Arouca.

On 12 January 2015, Kuca signed a three-and-a-half-year contract with Kardemir Karabükspor in the Turkish Süper Lig. In the summer, however, he returned to Portugal, being loaned to C.F. Os Belenenses. The following three seasons, he represented Rio Ave FC (still owned by Kardemir), Arouca and Boavista FC.

In October 2018, Kuca moved to the Romanian Liga I with FC Hermannstadt, alongside former Rio Ave teammate Pedro Moreira. He made his competitive debut on the 30th, coming on as a late substitute in a Cupa României match against FC Voluntari and scoring the final 3–0 which qualified to the quarter-finals.

International career
Kuca earned his first cap for Cape Verde on 28 March 2009, in a 5–0 friendly win over Equatorial Guinea. He scored his first goal on 15 November 2014, contributing to a 3–1 home victory against Niger in the 2015 Africa Cup of Nations qualifiers.

Kuca was summoned by manager Rui Águas for the finals in Equatorial Guinea, featuring in all three group stage fixtures as the Blue Sharks were eliminated at that stage with three draws.

International goals
 (Cape Verde score listed first, score column indicates score after each Kuca goal)

References

External links

1989 births
Living people
Sportspeople from Praia
Footballers from Santiago, Cape Verde
Cape Verdean footballers
Association football forwards
Cape Verdean National Championships players
Santiago South Premier Division players
AD Bairro players
Boavista FC (Cape Verde) players
Primeira Liga players
Liga Portugal 2 players
Segunda Divisão players
SC Mirandela players
G.D. Chaves players
G.D. Estoril Praia players
C.F. Os Belenenses players
Rio Ave F.C. players
F.C. Arouca players
Boavista F.C. players
C.D. Feirense players
U.D. Leiria players
Süper Lig players
Kardemir Karabükspor footballers
FC Hermannstadt players
Cape Verde international footballers
2015 Africa Cup of Nations players
Cape Verdean expatriate footballers
Expatriate footballers in Portugal
Expatriate footballers in Turkey
Expatriate footballers in Romania
Cape Verdean expatriate sportspeople in Portugal
Cape Verdean expatriate sportspeople in Turkey
Cape Verdean expatriate sportspeople in Romania